Panagiotis Liadelis (born December 7, 1974 in Volos, Greece) is a retired Greek professional basketball player. At a height of 1.94 m (6 ft 4  in) tall, he played as a point guard-shooting guard.

Professional career
Liadelis played for many successful teams. His first well-known club was the Greek club Aris Thessaloniki, where he played for many years and won the FIBA Korać Cup title, in the 1996–97 season, and the Greek Cup and Greek Cup MVP in 1998. He also played for the Greek clubs PAOK Thessaloniki, Makedonikos, Olympiacos Piraeus, and Apollon Patras. In all of those years, he was an efficient scorer in the Greek League and the EuroLeague, when he participated in the competition. His EuroLeague performances in the EuroLeague 2000–01 season, while wearing PAOK's jersey, earned him an All-EuroLeague Second Team selection.

He also played for the Russian Super League club Ural Great Perm, the Spanish ACB League club Valencia, and Azovmash Mariupol of the Ukrainian Super League.

In 2006, he moved to Azovmash Mariupol, and in the 2006–07 season, he was a finalist in the FIBA EuroCup, against Girona.

National team career
Liadelis was also a member of the senior men's Greek national team. He had a total of 25 caps (games played) with Greece's senior national team, in which he scored a total of 190 points, for a scoring average of 7.6 points per game.

Awards and accomplishments
4× Greek League All-Star: 1996 II, 1997, 1999, 2004
FIBA Korać Cup Champion: 1997
Greek Cup Winner: 1998
Greek Cup Finals Top Scorer: 1998
Greek Cup MVP: 1998
All-EuroLeague Second Team: 2001
Russian League Champion: 2002
3× Ukrainian Cup Winner: 2006, 2008, 2009
3× Ukrainian League Champion: 2007, 2008, 2009

References

External links 
Euroleague.net Profile
FIBA Archive Profile
Hellenic Federation Profile 
Spanish League Archive Profile 

1974 births
Living people
Apollon Patras B.C. players
Aris B.C. players
Basketball players from Volos
BC Azovmash players
Greek men's basketball players
Liga ACB players
Makedonikos B.C. players
Olympiacos B.C. players
P.A.O.K. BC players
PBC Ural Great players
Point guards
Shooting guards
Valencia Basket players